Live at Looney Tunes may refer to:

 Live at Looney Tunes (From Autumn to Ashes album)
 Live at Looney Tunes (Kevin Devine album)